Vicent is both a surname and a given name. Notable people with the name include:

Surname
Francesc Vicent (1450 – c. 1512), Spanish chess player
Francesc Vicent Garcia (1582–1623), Catalan poet
Josep Vicent (born 1970), Spanish music director and conductor
Tania Vicent (born 1976), Canadian speed skater

Given name
Vicent Partal (born 1960), Spanish journalist and writer
Vicent Peris (1478–1522), Spanish rebel

See also
78071 Vicent, main-belt asteroid
Casa Vicent, historic house in Porto, Portugal
Cala de Sant Vicent, holiday resort on Ibiza